Zhang Rui (born 17 January 1989) is a Chinese footballer who plays for Shandong Sports Lottery as a midfielder and for the China women's national football team.

International career
Zhang Rui made her debut for the Chinese women's national team on 4 March 2009 in a 0–0 draw with Sweden at the 2009 Algarve Cup.

International goals

See also
 List of women's footballers with 100 or more caps

References

External links 

 
 

1989 births
Living people
Chinese women's footballers
China women's international footballers
2015 FIFA Women's World Cup players
Footballers at the 2016 Summer Olympics
Sportspeople from Yantai
Footballers from Shandong
Women's association football midfielders
Footballers at the 2014 Asian Games
Olympic footballers of China
Footballers at the 2018 Asian Games
Asian Games silver medalists for China
Asian Games medalists in football
Medalists at the 2018 Asian Games
2019 FIFA Women's World Cup players
FIFA Century Club